Artur "Arturas" Mastianica (born 30 July 1992) is a male professional race walker who competes internationally for Lithuania.

In 2016 he broke personal record and was selected to represent Lithuania in 2016 Summer Olympics. In 2021 Mastianica broke Lithuanian national record with 3:48:24.

Personal bests

References

1992 births
Living people
Lithuanian male racewalkers
Place of birth missing (living people)
Athletes (track and field) at the 2016 Summer Olympics
Olympic athletes of Lithuania
Athletes (track and field) at the 2020 Summer Olympics
20th-century Lithuanian people
21st-century Lithuanian people